The Tradewinds Square Tower is a proposed megatall skyscraper located along Jalan Sultan Ismail in Kuala Lumpur, Malaysia. The building is currently in planning stage with Tradewinds Corporation Berhad as the developer. It was expected to be completed in 2022, but construction was halted in 2018.The whole integrated development was previously known as Tradewinds Centre, before being renamed to Tradewinds Square. The development will be built on the former Crowne Plaza Mutiara Hotel and Kompleks Antarabangsa site which were demolished in 2013. The company estimated that the RM6 billion ($1.37 billion USD) project would have taken seven years to complete, with construction expected to commence in early 2013. The development built up area is about 420,000 m2 (4,500,000 sq ft) which sits on a 7-acre freehold site between Jalan Sultan Ismail and Jalan Perak. It will comprise Grade A corporate offices, serviced apartments, a 6-star hotel, and a retail podium.
In 2016, the plot ratio for the development was increased to 16.

Public transport 
If completed, the tower and its development will be accessible via the  Raja Chulan Monorail station on the KL Monorail line.

See also 

 Tower M
 Merdeka 118
 List of tallest buildings in Malaysia

References

External links 

 Tradewinds Corporation tower webpage

Proposed skyscrapers
Proposed buildings and structures in Malaysia
Skyscrapers in Kuala Lumpur